The Toronto Balmy Beach Beachers were a Canadian football team based in Toronto, Ontario and a member of the Ontario Rugby Football Union, a league that preceded the Canadian Football League. Spanning three decades, they appeared in four Grey Cup championships, winning twice in 1927 and 1930, and were the longest lasting member of the ORFU.

History
The Beachers were runners-up to the national title in their first season of play in 1924 when they lost to Queen's University in the 12th Grey Cup game. They would go on to win the Grey Cup three years later in 15th Grey Cup, defeating the IRFU's Hamilton Tigers. After another three years, the Beachers would again return to the Grey Cup and were once again victorious, winning the 18th Grey Cup in 1930 in Canadian football over the Regina Roughriders. The Beachers would go on to win the ORFU championship 10 times in their history.

Due to the dominance of the Sarnia Imperials, the Beachers otherwise had very little success in the 1930s, qualifying for the playoffs three other times that decade, only to lose the ORFU Final to the Imperials. It wasn't until 1940 that the team made it back to the Grey Cup, when they lost to the Ottawa Rough Riders in the 28th Grey Cup game, the only Grey Cup to be played as a two-game series. They would continue to see futility as the team would not return to the Grey Cup for the remainder of their history.

On April 20, 1948, it was announced that the Beachers would merge with the Toronto Indians and assumed the name Toronto Beaches-Indians for that one season. The amalgamation took place due to the difficulty that the two teams were having in competing for fan support, in addition to the competition from the IRFU's Toronto Argonauts. The team finished in 2nd place that year with a 5-4 record, but lost to the Hamilton Tigers (who had transferred to the ORFU from the more competitive IRFU that year) in the ORFU Finals. On January 4, 1949, the club announced that the amalgamation would end and the Toronto Balmy Beach Beachers would resume play while the Indians would fold.

In 1953 they won the ORFU Championship and played in the Grey Cup semi-final against the Winnipeg Blue Bombers, losing in a hard fought game. The team struggled in the 1950s as the "Big Four" eastern teams and the five "Western Conference" teams began importing American players. The Beach was unable to pay the big salaries of the other two leagues and maintained an all-Canadian team which became increasingly less competitive. Despite a winning record (6-4) in 1956, their 1957 season was a disaster, losing all twelve games by a combined score of 570-35; the team folded at season's end. Many Canadian Balmy Beach players played with the "Big Four" and "Western Conference" teams and have since entered the Canadian Football Hall of Fame.

Canadian Football Hall of Famers
Ab Box
Dean Griffing
Ted Reeve
Mike Rodden
Annis Stukus
Bill Zock

Season-by-season

References

Ontario Rugby Football Union teams
Bal
Defunct Canadian football teams
Sports clubs established in 1924
Sports clubs disestablished in 1957
1924 establishments in Ontario
1957 disestablishments in Ontario